The Enos Wall Mansion, at 411 East South Temple, in Salt Lake City, Utah, was built in 1905.  It was designed by Richard K.A. Kletting. It was listed on the National Register of Historic Places as a contributing building in the South Temple Historic District.  

It serves as the Thomas S. Monson Center of the University of Utah.

References

Residential buildings in Salt Lake City
National Register of Historic Places in Salt Lake City
Neoclassical architecture in Utah
Residential buildings on the National Register of Historic Places in Utah
Residential buildings completed in 1905
1905 establishments in Utah